Bay of Islands Coastal Park is a  long coastal reserve located in Victoria, Australia on the Great Ocean Road between  Peterborough and Warrnambool. Lookout areas with parking are provided at the Bay of Martyrs, the Bay of Islands, Three Mile Beach and Childers Cove.

References

External links
 
 Official Website for 12 Apostles Region of Victoria
 Bay of Islands Coastal Park (Parks Victoria)

Coastal parks of Victoria (Australia)
Bays of Victoria (Australia)
Coastline of Victoria (Australia)
Parks of Barwon South West (region)